Sheetal Singh is an Indian actress best known for her role of 'Roshni' in the TV series Paanch 5 Wrongs Make A Right. Her film debut was Nasha in 2013 and followed by Horror Story. She was last seen in Halla Bol on Bindass Channel, Pyaar Tune Kya Kiya (TV series) on Zing, and Yeh Hai Aashqui on Bindass.

Background
Singh is from Lucknow. Her first breakthrough role came in the form of Bollywood movie Nasha in which she played the second female lead. Next was her role as Maya in Vikram Bhatt's production Horror Story. It was challenging as she had to go through a lengthy process of applying makeup to look the part. Horror Story was critically appreciated and was a moderate success at the box office. At that time, Singh had received a good amount of attention from the industry but what made her an overnight sensation was the youth-oriented TV series Paanch in which she played the leading role of Roshni Kataria. After that, Singh played the lead role in an episode of Bindass Halla Bol as a TV reporter who fights against her oppressor. She was then seen as the main in Pyaar Tune Kya Kiya on Zing where she plays a simple girl who falls for a 'superstar'. Singh would be returning soon in Bollywood with her film Friend Request'.'

Paanch 5 Wrongs Make a Right
Sheetal Singh received praise for her role 'Roshni' in TV series Paanch''. The show was a landmark success for Channel V and an hit amongst the youth audiences. Singh played the role of an 18-year-old girl who goes through traumatic situations after she loses her elder sister. She learns that five seniors of her college tortured her brutally and are responsible for her death. Roshni sets out to avenge her sister's death and teach each of them a good lesson. She goes through various challenges throughout her journey but emerges successful. Singh was nominated for the best debutante (Female) in Gold Awards 2014.

Filmography

Television

Serials

References

1989 births
Circle in the Square Theatre School alumni
Actresses in Hindi television
Living people
Actresses from Lucknow
University of Mumbai alumni